Mazurka is a 1935 German drama film directed by Willi Forst and starring Pola Negri, Albrecht Schoenhals, and Ingeborg Theek. A woman is put on trial for murdering a predatory musician. It takes its name from the Mazurka, a Polish folk dance.

Warner Brothers Studios acquired the U.S. distribution rights but shelved the film in favor of its own scene-by-scene 1937 English language remake, Confession, which starred Kay Francis. Mazurka's sets were designed by the art director Hermann Warm. It was partly shot on location in Warsaw. The film was made by Cine-Allianz whose Jewish owners Arnold Pressburger and Gregor Rabinovitch were dispossessed during pre-production of the film.

Plot summary

Cast
 Pola Negri as Vera, a singer
 Albrecht Schoenhals as Grigorij Michailow
 Ingeborg Theek as Lisa
 Franziska Kinz as Mother
 Paul Hartmann as Boris Kierow
 Hans Hermann Schaufuss as Defense lawyer
 Inge List as Hilde
 Friedrich Kayßler as Judge
 Georg Georgi
 Antonie Jaeckel

Reception
Writing for The Spectator in 1937, Graham Greene gave the film a reserved middling review, praising the first twenty minutes as "admirable", but expressed his view that Pola Negri's performance for the remainder of the film was "deliberately [...] guy[ed]" by director Forst. Greene complained that "Negri may be unwise to return to the films, but it is a cruel idea of fun to guy [her] for the pleasure of audiences who have forgotten [her]". Unusually for Greene, he also provided a second opinion from Sydney Carroll's The Sunday Times review which lavished praise on Negri's performance and advised "every pert little miss who fancies herself an embryo star" to pay close attention to the authentic vividness Negri brought to the role.

References

Bibliography

External links
 
 

1935 films
Films of Nazi Germany
1935 drama films
1930s German-language films
Films directed by Willi Forst
Cine-Allianz films
Tobis Film films
German black-and-white films
German drama films
1930s German films